Segizinchi Mart (- Vosmoye Marta, both meaning "8 March") is a town in the Naryn District, Naryn Region of Kyrgyzstan. Its population was 2,655 in 2021.

References

External links
Segizinchi Mart Map – Maplandia.com

 

Populated places in Naryn Region